Chautisa or Chautisha is a genre of literary composition in Indian literature. It was popular form of writing in medieval  poetry. It is a form of constrained writing where each verse begins with consecutive letters of the alphabet, typically starting with the first consonant. The word 'Chautisa' means thirty four, signifying the number of consonants in Odia script.

History
Chautisa is one of the earliest form of poetry in Odia language. Numerous Chautisas have been written in medieval Odia literature. The Prachi Samiti(1925-34) collected and published four volumes of medieval poetry and contains hundreds of Chautisas. The earliest known Chautisa is the Kesaba koili of Markanda Dasa.

Baladeba Ratha, Banamali Dasa, Dinakrushna Dasa are some of the most famous poets who wrote Chautisas.

Structure
Typically the poetry starts with the letter କ and ends with କ୍ଷ . Each verse or line of each couplet starts with the same letter.

There are some poetic liberties taken by the poets. Such as in place of the letter ଙ/ଞ, words beginning with ନ are used as there are no words that begin with those letters.

Some poets reverse the order of the letters and wrote starting from  କ୍ଷ and ends with କ. This is called Olata Chautisa.

Typically the Chautisas have 34 couplets/stanzas. Other popular variants include:

Chautisa with 2 couplets- each couplet containing 17 consonants.
Chautisa with 3 couplets- two couplets containing 12 consonants and one couplet with 10 consonants.
Chautisa with 6 couplets- Eg- Chitau chautisa by Upendra Bhanja.
Chautisa with 9 couplets- Eg- Hanumanta Janana Chautisa by Damodara Dasa.

References

Odia literature
Indian literature
Odia-language poems
Literary genres
Medieval Indian literature